Sivry-Rance is a municipality of Wallonia located in the province of Hainaut, Belgium. 

On January 1, 2018, Sivry-Rance had a total population of 4,833. The total area is 72.97 km² which gives a population density of 63 inhabitants per km².

The municipality consists of the following districts: Grandrieu, Montbliart, Rance, Sautin, and Sivry.

See also
 Rouge de Rance, a Devonian red reef limestone prized as a decorative building material

References

External links
 

Municipalities of Hainaut (province)